The Box Office Entertainment Award for Box Office Queen is an award presented annually by the Memorial Scholarship Foundation, led by Corazon Samaniego. It was first awarded at the 1st Box Office Entertainment Awards ceremony in 1971. Nora Aunor was the first recipient of the Box Office Queen award.

Sharon Cuneta is the only actress to be elevated to the Box Office Queen Hall of Fame for winning the box-office queen title nine times.

Winners

Multiple awards for Box Office Queen
Throughout the history of Box Office Entertainment Awards, there have been actresses who have received multiple awards for Box-Office Queen.

Notes

References

Film awards for lead actress
Box Office Entertainment Awards